The 1940–41 NCAA men's basketball season began in December 1940, progressed through the regular season and conference tournaments, and concluded with the 1941 NCAA basketball tournament championship game on March 29, 1941, at Municipal Auditorium in Kansas City, Missouri. The Wisconsin Badgers won their first NCAA national championship with a 39–34 victory over the Washington State Cougars.

Season headlines 

 The National Invitation Tournament — considered until at least the mid-1950s to be more prestigious than the NCAA tournament — expanded from six to eight teams.
 The National Association of Basketball Coaches turned over operation of the NCAA tournament to the NCAA itself.
 In February 1943, the Helms Athletic Foundation retroactively selected Wisconsin as its national champion for the 1940–41 season.
 In 1995, the Premo-Porretta Power Poll retroactively selected Long Island as its national champion for the 1940–41 season.

Conference membership changes

Regular season

Conference winners and tournaments

Statistical leaders

Post-season tournaments

NCAA tournament

Semifinals & finals

National Invitation tournament

Semifinals & finals 

 Third Place – CCNY 42, Seton Hall 27

Awards

Consensus All-American teams

Major player of the year awards 

 Helms Player of the Year: George Glamack, North Carolina (retroactive selection in 1944)

Other major awards 

 NIT/Haggerty Award (Top player in New York City metro area): Jack Garfinkel, St. John's

Coaching changes

References